The Mobile Suit Gundam SEED anime series is animated by the Japanese anime studio Sunrise and directed by Mitsuo Fukuda. It aired from October 5, 2002 to September 27, 2003, with fifty episodes on TBS. As with other series from the Gundam franchise, Gundam SEED takes place in a parallel timeline, in this case the Cosmic Era, the first to do so. In this era, mankind has developed into two subspecies: Naturals, who reside on Earth and Coordinators, genetically-enhanced humans capable of withstanding the rigors of space who inhabit orbital colonies. The story revolves around a young Coordinator Kira Yamato who becomes involved in the war between the two races after a neutral space colony is invaded by the Coordinators.

Mobile Suit Gundam SEED was dubbed in English and its first English air date was on April 17, 2004 on the American cable network Cartoon Network as part of its Saturday night Toonami block, and was later moved to its unnamed "Graveyard Shift" block on late Friday evenings/early Saturday mornings in late 2004. It was later broadcast on Canada's YTV starting on September 10, 2004, Australia's Adult Swim starting on December 12, 2005, and the United Kingdom's AnimeCentral starting on January 5, 2008.

Seven themes of music were used for the original version of the series. The English TV dub used a 30-second shortened version of "Invoke" as its opening, but used the same endings as the original. The English DVD dub uses the original openings in their original format. For Japan's HD remaster, Gundam SEED cut the two recap episodes from its original broadcast (14 and 26).

A sequel called Mobile Suit Gundam SEED Destiny, aired from October 9, 2004 to October 1, 2005, also with fifty episodes. Both SEED and SEED Destiny have special editions which are condensed versions of the series that include additional footage. Mobile Suit Gundam SEED C.E. 73: Stargazer, which is directed by Susumu Nishizawa, is a three-episode original net animation (ONA). The first episode of the side story was first streamed on the internet on July 14, 2006, but it premiered a week earlier on July 7, 2006 at Tokyo Anime Center's Akiba 3D Theater.

Episode list

Mobile Suit Gundam SEED
The series is compiled onto thirteen DVDs in Japan and ten DVDs in English-speaking countries. A five-minute epilogue was included on the final DVD of the Japanese and European release, but it was not included on the North American and Australian release.

Mobile Suit Gundam SEED: Special Edition

Mobile Suit Gundam SEED: Special Edition, also known as Mobile Suit Gundam SEED: Movie, summarizes the fifty episode television series in three 95 minute episodes – much like the compilation movies for the original series, Zeta Gundam, and Turn A Gundam. The episodes contain a compilation of scenes from the television series and an additional twenty minutes of new footage. Only the first two episodes were broadcast in Japan, each episode split into two 55 minute parts. The Special Editions is available in Japan and North America on three DVDs or three PlayStation Portable UMDs.

Mobile Suit Gundam SEED C.E. 73 Stargazer

Mobile Suit Gundam SEED C.E. 73 Stargazer is a three episode original net animation (ONA) side story that takes place during the timeline of Gundam SEED Destiny. Unlike the other series set in the Cosmic Era, C.E. 73 Stargazer is directed by  Susumu Nishizawa and features a new cast of characters. The episodes were not broadcast on television, but streamed through the Bandai Channel and sold on one DVD in Japan. The first episode was released on the Bandai Channel on July 14, 2006, but it premiered a week earlier at the Tokyo Anime Center's Akiba 3D Theater on July 7, 2006. It uses one piece of music.

References

Mobile Suit Gundam SEED
Seed